"Love Will Find a Way" is a single released by American rock group Pablo Cruise from the album Worlds Away in May 1978. On the Billboard Hot 100, "Love Will Find a Way" peaked at number 6.

The song received a considerable amount of airplay during the summer of 1978, prompting critic Robert Christgau to say, "Hear David Jenkins sing 'once you get past the pain' fifty times in a day and the pain will be permanent", referring to the lyrics of the chorus.

Chart performance

Weekly charts

Year-end charts

References

External links
 

1970s ballads
1978 singles
1978 songs
Pablo Cruise songs
A&M Records singles
Rock ballads